The 2012 Asian Challenge Cup, also known as the Nikon Asian Challenge Cup 2012, is the annual football event held in Hong Kong during Lunar New Year. The name of this event was changed from the Lunar New Year Cup to the Asian Challenge Cup in 2011.

Teams

Squads

South China
Manager:  Ján Kocian

Guangzhou R&F
Manager:  Sérgio Farias

Shimizu S-Pulse
Manager:  Afshin Ghotbi

Seongnam Ilhwa Chunma
Manager:  Shin Tae-yong

Fixtures and results

Semi-finals

Third place match

Final

References

External links
 Asian Challenge Cup - Hong Kong Football Association

International association football competitions hosted by Hong Kong
Lunar New Year Cup
Asia